The Isis River Bridge is a road bridge over the Isis River south of Childers, Queensland, Australia.

The bridge was built on a new and improved alignment of the Bruce Highway. It replaced the 54-year-old bridge which was prone to flooding. The new bridge will improve flood immunity as it is almost seven metres higher than the old bridge.

The new bridge, constructed by Seymour Whyte, opened to traffic on 12 August 2011. The old bridge was demolished on completion of the project in late September 2011.

The project was jointly funded by the Australian and Queensland Governments.

References

External links
 Isis River Bridge project at Department of Transport and Main Roads webpage
 Isis River Bridge Replacement at Seymour Whyte Constructions webpage
 New Isis River Bridge at Department of Infrastructure and Transport webpage

2011 establishments in Australia
Road bridges in Queensland
Bridges completed in 2011
Beam bridges
Concrete bridges in Australia